The Purna River is a river of Western India. It is one of the chief tributaries of the Tapti river and empties into it at Changdev in Jalgaon, Maharashtra.

Etymology
The word purna means complete in Sanskrit. It was also called the Payoshni or the Paisani (Sanskrit word meaning Ambrosia), which is mentioned in the Mahabharata as being located in the territory of Vidarbha at the northern entrance of the Dandaka Forest. There are other rivers also named Purna (the Khadakpurna and the Katepurna).

Several comparative societies are named after the Purna river, as is the Purnamai Vidyalaya, a high school in Muktainagar taluka (Purna referring to the river and Maai meaning mother). The Purna is a major tributary of the Tapti river.

Description
The Purna is the main water source for the Muktainagar, Malkapur region. It rises in the eastern Satpura Range of southern Madhya Pradesh, and flows westward, draining Maharashtra's Marathwada, Vidarbha region before merging with the Tapi river. The total length of the river is 334 km. 

The watershed lies mostly in the eastern Vidarbha region of Maharashtra state and is nearly 18,929 square kilometres.

The Purna originates in Pokharni village which is 2 km away from Bhainsdehi. Bhainsdehi is a tehsil in the Betul district of Madhya Pradesh, adjoining the Amravati district of Maharashtra. The river flows through Akola, Buldhana, and Jalgaon districts. Pilgrims are present along its banks at Muktabai temple at Muktainagar and Changdev temple at Changdev village.

The river is habitat for many fish species and birds like Bagda, ducks etc. Hatnur dam is built on the Purna near Hatnur village. This dam is the largest dam in northern Maharashta. It has a huge water reservoir.

Confluence
The Purna meets the Tapti at Changdev village in the Muktainagar taluk of Jalgaon District in Northern Maharashtra. The Changdeva Maharaj temple is built at this meeting place (Sangam) of the two rivers as devotees believe it to be sacred (pavitra sthan).

River tributaries
The Purna river and its tributaries
 Purna River
 Gotma River
 Aarna River
 Pendhi River
 Uma River
 Katepurna River
 Shahanur River
 Bhavkhuri River
 Chandrabhaga river
 Bhuleswari River
 Morna River
 Mann River
 Mas River
 Utawali River
 Vishwamitri River
 Nirguna River
 Gandhari River
 Aas River
River Dnyanganga
River Vishwaganga
River Nalaganga
 Vaan River
 Nadganga

Gallery

References

Rivers of Maharashtra
Rivers of Madhya Pradesh
Tributaries of the Tapti River

Rivers of India